Bishop Nykanor Deyneha (8 December 1907 – 8 November 1982) was the clandestine Ukrainian Auxiliary bishop of Lviv of the Ukrainian Greek Catholic Church. Also he was leader of the Studite Brethren as the clandestine Archimandrite of the Univ Lavra during the time of the religion persecution in the Soviet Union. In addition, bishop Nykanor was a Nazi prisoner from 1942 to 1943.

Life

Bishop Nykanor (his given name was Mykola; Nykanor is his monastic name) was born in Svystilnyky village (now is Svitanok village, Ivano-Frankivsk Raion, Ivano-Frankivsk Oblast) into a peasant family. After graduation from the school, he joined the Studite Brethren in the end of 1934 as a novice on 16 June  1935 was tonsured as a monk in the Univ Lavra. On 15 July 1938, he had last monastic vows. Next year he was ordained as hierodeacon (1 October 1939) and hieromonk (29 October 1939), after successful graduation from the Lviv Theological Seminary, and in 1943 was appointed as superior in St. Joseph Lviv filial monastery.

Before this time, on 11 December 1942, he was arrested and imprisoned by Nazis for "anti-Nazi activities". However, six months later he was released, because the Nazis did not know that the Jews hid in the monastery.

In 1951, when in Vladimir Central Prison died as a martyr of the faith previous Archimandrite, Father Klymentiy Sheptytsky, Nykanor was elected as his successor. During this time he clandestinely organized the catacomb theologian seminary.

In February 1972 he was consecrated as auxiliary bishop for underground Ukrainian Catholic Archeparchy of Lviv by Blessed Bishop Vasyl Velychkovsky, that in this time was the Administrator for all the Ukrainian Greek Catholic Church in catacombs.

References

External links
Ukrainian Clandestine Hierarchs
Profile at catholic-hierarchy.org
Profile at GCatholic.org 

1907 births
People from Ivano-Frankivsk Oblast
People from the Kingdom of Galicia and Lodomeria
Ukrainian Austro-Hungarians
Bishops of the Ukrainian Greek Catholic Church
1982 deaths
Ukrainian Eastern Catholics
Studite Brethren
Burials at Yaniv Cemetery